The 2014–15 Abilene Christian Wildcats women's basketball team represents Abilene Christian University during the 2014–15 NCAA Division I women's basketball season. The Wildcats are led by third year head coach Julie Goodenough and play their home games at the Moody Coliseum. This will be the second year of a 4-year transition phase from D2 to D1, In the second year of transition, Abilene Christian cannot participate in the Southland Tournament, but will be a Division I counter and will be part of the Division I rpi calculation.  The Wildcats will play a full conference schedule in 2014–15. Although not eligible for the Southland Conference and NCAA tournament, the Wildcats will be able to participate in the WNIT or WBI tournaments if invited.

Roster

Schedule
Source

|-
!colspan=9 style="background:#531C79; color:#FFFFFF;"| Out of Conference Schedule

|-
!colspan=9 style="background:#531C79; color:#FFFFFF;"| Southland Conference Schedule

See also
2014–15 Abilene Christian Wildcats men's basketball team

References

Abilene Christian Wildcats women's basketball seasons
Abilene Christian
Abilene Christian Wildcats basketball
Abilene Christian Wildcats basketball